Sia Sia or Siya Siya may refer to various places in Iran:
Sia Sia-ye Habib
Sia Sia-ye Keykhosrow
Sia Sia-ye Sheykheh

See also
Siah Siah (disambiguation), various places in Iran